King Solomon of Broadway is a 1935 American musical film directed by Alan Crosland and starring Edmund Lowe, Dorothy Page and Pinky Tomlin. A shady figure wins a nightclub during a card game.

Cast
 Edmund Lowe as King Solomon  
 Dorothy Page as Sheba  
 Pinky Tomlin as Pinky  
 Louise Henry as Nikki Bradbury  
 Edward Pawley as 'Ice' Larson  
 Charley Grapewin as Uncle Winchester  
 Bradley Page as Roth  
 Arthur Vinton as Murray  
 Clyde Dilson as Schultz 
 William Bailey as Detective  
 Frank Du Frane as Detective  
 Knute Erickson as Dooman  
 Huntley Gordon as Doctor  
 Arthur Stuart Hull as Judge  
 Charles Judels as Hot dog man  
 Isabel La Mal as Maid  
 Sam McDaniel as Attendant  
 Charles R. Moore as Waiter  
 Fred Santley as Announcer  
 Fred 'Snowflake' Toones as Waiter  
 Guy Usher as Detective  
 Marie Werner as Wash woman  
 Eric Wilton as Butler

References

Bibliography
 Monaco, James. The Encyclopedia of Film. Perigee Books, 1991.

External links
 

1935 films
1935 musical films
American musical films
Films directed by Alan Crosland
Universal Pictures films
American black-and-white films
1930s English-language films
1930s American films